Ernst Volland (born 1946 in Bürgstadt/Miltenberg) is a German artist, photographer, cartoonist, gallerist, blogger, curator and writer living in Berlin. His main areas of endeavour are comics and comic photos; as well, he has published "fake art". His agency is named "Voller Ernst", an ironic term which may be translated as "total seriousness".

Selected publications
 Plakate-Karikaturen. Atelier im Bauernhaus, Fischerhude 1977, .
 With Stefan Aust: Schöne Ansichten. Das Ernst Volland-Buch. Rasch und Röhring, Hamburg 1987, .
 Felix ganz allein auf der Welt. Ravensburger, 1989.
 With Peter Huth: Dies Buch ist pure Fälschung. Von A bis Z: Alles Fälschung. Zweitausendeins, Frankfurt 1989.
 With Evgenij A. Chaldej (Hrsg.): Von Moskau nach Berlin – Bilder des russischen Fotografen Jewgeni Chaldej. Nicolai, Berlin 1994.
 Gott und andere Götter. With einem Fake auf der Suche nach Gott. Verlag M, Berlin 2008, .
 Das Banner des Sieges. Story, Berlin 2008, .
 Heinrich-Böll-Stiftung (Hrsg.): Eingebrannte Bilder. Katalog. 2009, .
 Nachwort in: Manfred Günther Wörterbuch Jugend – Alter. Berlin 2010.
 Genussvoll verzichten. Buch, Verlag Büchse Der Pandora 2013, .
 With David King: John Heartfield: Laughter is a Devastating Weapon. Tate Publishing 2015, 
 Stories. Berlin 2016

References

External links 
 http://ernstvolland.de/en/
 https://blogs.taz.de/vollandsblog/

1946 births
Living people
German artists
German non-fiction writers